Three Ladies (Spanish: Trío de damas) is a 1960 Spanish comedy film directed by Pedro Lazaga and starring Francisco Rabal, Laura Valenzuela and José Luis López Vázquez.

Cast  
 Francisco Rabal as Alberto Sáinz Robledo  
 Laura Valenzuela as Ana / Lola / Monique  
 José Luis López Vázquez as Julio  
 Carmen Ignarra 
 Maruja Bustos 
 Santiago Ríos 
 Jesús Puente as Juan  
 Ana María Custodio 
 Ismael Merlo as Dr. San Román  
 Mayrata O'Wisiedo 
 Erasmo Pascual as Dr. José Lazapuch  
 Ángela Bravo 
 José Orjas as Joyero #1 
 Amparo Baró as Empleada tienda de moda  
 Juan Cazalilla as Opositor a notarías enagenado  
 Emilio Rodríguez as Joyero #2  
 Fernando Sánchez Polack as Horacio, un basurero

References

Bibliography 
 de España, Rafael. Directory of Spanish and Portuguese film-makers and films. Greenwood Press, 1994.

External links 
 

1960 comedy films
Spanish comedy films
1960 films
1960s Spanish-language films
Films directed by Pedro Lazaga
Films produced by Ricardo Sanz
1960s Spanish films